A Night in Casablanca is a 1946 film starring the Marx Brothers: (Groucho Marx, Harpo Marx and Chico Marx). The picture was directed by Archie Mayo, and written by Joseph Fields and Roland Kibbee.
                                                                                                                                                                  
The film also features The Three Stooges supporting actors Philip Van Zandt, Ethelreda Leopold, Eugene Borden and Harry Semels and actress and singer Lisette Verea in her final film with the Marxes. The villain is portrayed by Sig Ruman, who had roles in the earlier Marx Brothers films A Night at the Opera (1935) and A Day at the Races (1937).

Plot
Set in Casablanca shortly after World War II, escaped Nazi war criminal Heinrich Stubel has steadily murdered three managers of the Hotel Casablanca. Disguised as a Count Pfefferman, Stubel's goal is to reclaim the stolen art treasures that he has hidden in the hotel. However, the only way he can do this undetected is by murdering the hotel's managers and running the hotel himself.

The newest manager of Hotel Casablanca is former motel proprietor Ronald Kornblow, who is very much unaware that he has been hired because no one else will dare take the position. Inept Kornblow takes charge of the hotel, and eventually crosses paths with Corbaccio, owner of the Yellow Camel company, who appoints himself as Kornblow's bodyguard, aided and abetted by Stubel's valet Rusty. In his many efforts to murder Kornblow, Stubel sends beautiful Beatrice Reiner to romance the clueless manager.

Before Stubel can make his escape to the airfield with the loot, Kornblow, Corbaccio, Rusty and Beatrice invade his hotel room and sneak from suitcase to closet and back again to unpack his bags, which serves to drive him thoroughly mad. Arrested on false charges, Kornblow, Corbaccio and Rusty eventually crash Stubel's plane into a police station where the brothers expose Stubel as an escaped Nazi.

Cast
 Groucho Marx as Ronald Kornblow
 Harpo Marx as Rusty
 Chico Marx as Corbaccio
 Charles Drake as Lieutenant Pierre Delmar
 Lois Collier as Annette
 Sig Ruman as Count Pfefferman alias Heinrich Stubel 
 Lisette Verea as Beatrice Reiner
 Lewis L. Russell as Governor Gandaloux
 Dan Seymour as Prefect of Police Captain Brizzard
 Frederick Giermann as Kurt
 Harro Mellor as Emile
 David Hoffman as Spy
 Paul Harvey as Mr. Smythe

Legal myth
A popular story (spread in part by Groucho himself) surrounding the movie is that the Marx Brothers were threatened with a lawsuit by Warner Bros. for the use of the word "Casablanca" in the film's title due to it being an infringement on the company's rights to the 1942 film Casablanca. Groucho responded with a letter asserting that he and his siblings had use of the word "brothers" prior to the establishment of Warner Brothers (and many others had before that), and often the story is told that Groucho threatened a counter-suit based on this assertion. He also mentioned that he would consider further legal action by pointing out to Warners that the title of their current hit film Night and Day infringed on the titles of two Marx Brothers films were released by MGM: A Night at the Opera and A Day at the Races.

The true story is that the original storyline for the film was intended to be a direct parody of Casablanca, with the characters having similar-sounding names to the characters and actors in the 1942 film. Groucho Marx has said that an early draft named his character "Humphrey Bogus", a reference to the leading actor in Casablanca, Humphrey Bogart. Warner Bros. did not litigate, nor threaten to litigate. However, the studio issued a formal inquiry to the Marx Brothers concerning the plot and script of the film.

The Marx Brothers exploited the situation for publicity, making it appear to the public that a frivolous lawsuit was in the works, and Groucho sent several open letters to Warner Bros. to get newspaper coverage. These letters were among those he donated to the Library of Congress, and he reprinted them in his 1967 book The Groucho Letters. There is no evidence that Warner Bros. ever responded to any of Groucho’s letters.

Ultimately, the matter ended without legal action, and the storyline of the film was changed to be a send-up of the genre rather than Casablanca specifically.

The title A Night in Casablanca is a play on the expression of 1929’s "A Night in Venice” starring Ted Healy and his Southern Gentlemen (later The Three Stooges) Moe Howard, Larry Fine and Shemp Howard (later Curly Howard, Joe Besser and Curly-Joe DeRita).

References

External links

 
 
 
 
 The Warner Bros. story at snopes.com
 The letter to Warner Bros. (broken link)
 The Marx Brothers Council Podcast episode discussing the film

1946 films
1946 comedy films
American black-and-white films
1940s English-language films
Films directed by Archie Mayo
Films set in hotels
Films set in Morocco
Films shot in California
Marx Brothers (film series)
United Artists films
Films produced by David L. Loew
Films with screenplays by Frank Tashlin
American comedy films
Films scored by Werner Janssen
1940s American films
Casablanca (film)